The 2000–01 Bulgarian Hockey League season was the 49th season of the Bulgarian Hockey League, the top level of ice hockey in Bulgaria. Six teams participated in the league, and HK Slavia Sofia won the championship.

Regular season

Final 
 HK Levski Sofia - HK Slavia Sofia 4:2/3:5 (1:2 SO)

External links
 Season on hockeyarchives.info

Bulgar
Bulgarian Hockey League seasons
Bulg